There are more than 300 colleges and universities in North Korea. Universities and colleges in North Korea are classified into central class and local colleges. Also, they can be classified into social, special, and military colleges. Special colleges were established with the purpose to raise top executives. Students who have just graduated from high school cannot enter special colleges without any experience in industrial or cooperative farm careers. In North Korea, there are only two universities such as Kim Il Sung University and Kim Chaek University of Technology. All the others are colleges.

List

See also 
 List of universities and colleges in South Korea
 Korea University (Japan)

References

Works cited

External links 
 Democratic People's Republic of Korea - Educational Establishment

North Korea education-related lists
Korea, North
Korea, North
Lists of organizations based in North Korea